A Risley or Risley act (also antipode or antipodism) is any circus acrobalance posture where the base is lying down on their back, supporting one or more flyers with their hands, feet and/or other parts of the body; spinning a person or object using only one's feet.

The act is named after Richard Risley Carlisle (1814–1874) who developed this kind of act in the United States.

Risleys can be separated into three general categories of skills:
 Skills that are based with the hands
 Skills that are based with the feet
 Other

See also 
 Acroyoga
 Professor Risley and the Imperial Japanese Troupe

References 

Circus skills